Cytosol alanyl aminopeptidase (arylamidase, aminopolypeptidase, thiol-activated aminopeptidase, human liver aminopeptidase, puromycin-sensitive aminopeptidase, soluble alanyl aminopeptidase, cytosol aminopeptidase III, alanine aminopeptidase) is an enzyme. This enzyme catalyses the following chemical reaction

 Release of an N-terminal amino acid, preferentially alanine, from a wide range of peptides, amides and arylamides

This puromycin-sensitive enzyme is Co2+-activated zinc-sialoglycoprotein.

References

External links 
 

EC 3.4.11